Coptotriche amelanchieris is a moth of the family Tischeriidae. It is found in North America, including Ohio and Kentucky.

The larvae feed on Amelanchier arborea. They mine the leaves of their host plant.

References

Moths described in 1972
Tischeriidae